Fettercairn is a stop on the Luas light-rail tram system in Dublin, Ireland.  It opened in 2011 as a stop on the extension of the Red Line to Saggart.  The stop is located on a section of reserved track at the side of Katherine Tynan Road in south-west Dublin, between the Fettercairn suburb and Roadstone Quarry.  
The stop is also served by Dublin Bus routes 210 and 56A.

References

Luas Red Line stops in South Dublin (county)